Elections to Down District Council were held on 15 May 1985 on the same day as the other Northern Irish local government elections. The election used four district electoral areas to elect a total of 23 councillors.

Election results

Note: "Votes" are the first preference votes.

Districts summary

|- class="unsortable" align="centre"
!rowspan=2 align="left"|Ward
! % 
!Cllrs
! % 
!Cllrs
! %
!Cllrs
! %
!Cllrs
! %
!Cllrs
! %
!Cllrs
!rowspan=2|TotalCllrs
|- class="unsortable" align="center"
!colspan=2 bgcolor="" | SDLP
!colspan=2 bgcolor="" | UUP
!colspan=2 bgcolor="" | DUP
!colspan=2 bgcolor="" | Sinn Féin
!colspan=2 bgcolor="" | Workers Party
!colspan=2 bgcolor="white"| Others
|-
|align="left"|Ballynahinch
|bgcolor="#99FF66"|40.5
|bgcolor="#99FF66"|2
|33.3
|2
|18.9
|1
|0.0
|0
|0.0
|0
|7.3
|0
|5
|-
|align="left"|Downpatrick
|bgcolor="#99FF66"|57.4
|bgcolor="#99FF66"|4
|16.3
|1
|0.0
|0
|9.9
|1
|9.1
|1
|7.3
|0
|7
|-
|align="left"|Newcastle
|bgcolor="#99FF66"|40.8
|bgcolor="#99FF66"|3
|22.1
|1
|12.0
|1
|14.0
|1
|5.8
|0
|5.3
|0
|6
|-
|align="left"|Rowallane
|22.4
|1
|bgcolor="40BFF5"|55.7
|bgcolor="40BFF5"|3
|21.9
|1
|0.0
|0
|0.0
|0
|0.0
|0
|5
|- class="unsortable" class="sortbottom" style="background:#C9C9C9"
|align="left"| Total
|41.6
|10
|30.3
|7
|12.2
|3
|6.5
|1
|4.2
|1
|5.2
|0
|23
|-
|}

District results

Ballynahinch

1985: 2 x SDLP, 2 x UUP, 1 x DUP

Downpatrick

1985: 4 x SDLP, 1 x UUP, 1 x Sinn Féin, 1 x Workers' Party

Newcastle

1985: 3 x SDLP, 1 x UUP, 1 x Sinn Féin, 1 x DUP

Rowallane

1985: 3 x UUP, 1 x DUP, 1 x SDLP

References

Down District Council elections
Down